Cerritos (Spanish for "Little hills") is a city in Los Angeles County, California, United States, and is one of several cities that constitute the Gateway Cities of southeast Los Angeles County. It was incorporated on April 24, 1956. As of 2019, the population was 49,859. It is part of the Los Angeles–Long Beach–Anaheim, California Metropolitan Statistical Area designated by the Office of Management and Budget.

History 

Cerritos was originally inhabited by Native Americans belonging to the Tongva (or "People of the Earth"). The Tongva were called the "Gabrieleños" by the Spanish settlers after the nearby Mission San Gabriel Arcángel. The Tongva were the largest group of indigenous peoples in Southern California as well as the most developed in the region.
The Tongva lived off the land, deriving food from the animals or plants that could be gathered, snared or hunted, and grinding acorns as a staple.

Beginning in the late 15th century, Spanish explorers arrived in the New World and worked their way to the California coast in 1542. The colonization process included "civilizing" the native populations in California by establishing various missions. Soon afterward, a town called El Pueblo de Nuestra Señora la Reina de los Ángeles de Porciúncula (Los Angeles today) would be founded and prosper with the aid of subjects from New Spain and Native American labor.

One soldier, José Manuel Nieto, was granted a large plot of land by the 
Spanish King Carlos III, which he named Rancho Los Nietos. It covered  of what are today the cities of Cerritos, Long Beach, Lakewood, Downey, Norwalk, Santa Fe Springs, part of Whittier, Huntington Beach, Buena Park and Garden Grove.

The rancho was divided five ways among Nieto's heirs during the nationalization of church property by the Mexican government, with Juan José Nieto retaining the largest plot, called Rancho Los Coyotes. Nieto called the area of Rancho Los Coyotes "cerritos" or "little hills".

After the Mexican–American War, the rancho would eventually wind up in the hands of the Los Angeles and San Bernardino Land Company, which encouraged development and rail lines to be built by Henry E. Huntington and his Pacific Electric Railway company. It was through rapid development, combined with improved transportation systems, that the modern-day city of Artesia was formed in Rancho Los Coyotes in 1875, and from it, the city of Dairy Valley.

Cranford Airport, a small general-aviation airport, was built around 1946 and consisted of two 2,300-foot runways, one oriented north–south & the other northeast–southwest. Each runway had a parallel taxiway, and a ramp along the south side of the field had two building hangars. The former airport site is on the northwest corner of the intersection of South Street & Carmenita Road. Cranford Airport closed at some point between 1953 and 1954.

The city of Dairy Valley was incorporated on April 24, 1956, as a reaction to nearby Artesia's rapid urbanization. The city's name symbolized the more than 400 dairies, 100,000 cows and 106,300 chickens found within its limits. The cows outnumbered the 3,439 residents by a factor of 29 to 1. The chickens outnumbered the residents by over 30 to 1. The first business license in the new city was for Walter Marlowe's "Dairy Valley Egg Farms".

Two years later, Dairy Valley voted to become a chartered California city. As land values and property taxes in California rose in the early 1960s, agriculture became increasingly unprofitable, and development pressures increased. In a special election held on July 16, 1963, residents voted to permit large-scale residential development. As a reflection of its newly planned suburban orientation, the city's name was formally changed to Cerritos on January 10, 1967, after the nearby Spanish land grant Rancho Los Cerritos, which figured prominently in the region, and after Cerritos College in neighboring Norwalk.

Cerritos is a prime example of the "fiscalization" of California politics after the tax revolt of the 1970s and the passage of Proposition 13. The only way for California cities to raise long-term tax revenue in light of Proposition 13 was to create as many commercial zones as possible to take advantage of the percentage of county sales tax allocated back to municipalities as sales tax revenue. Cerritos was one of the first cities in Los Angeles County to develop large-scale retail zones, such as the Los Cerritos Center and Cerritos Auto Square, and achieved stunning success. City leaders reinvested funds into the community with large public works projects and an increasing number of community services and programs.

The current progressive nature of the Cerritos government and the unusually strong tax base is best reflected in its facilities. In 1978, Cerritos dedicated the nation's first solar-heated City Hall complex. In 1993, the Cerritos Center for the Performing Arts opened its doors. In 1994, the City unveiled the Cerritos Towne Center project, combining office, retail, lodging, fine arts and dining in an open-air location. In 1997, the city opened the Cerritos Sheriff's Station/Community Safety Center to provide public safety services. In 2002, the City rededicated its public library. In 2006, the City celebrated its golden anniversary with memorials and the unveiling of a sculpture garden. The assessed valuation of the city is $7,177,428,066.

Between 1970 and 1972, Cerritos was the fastest-growing city in California; the population skyrocketed from 16,000 to 38,000. Since the 1980s, Cerritos has attracted a large number of Filipino, Korean, Taiwanese, Indian and Chinese immigrant families.

On August 31, 1986, Aeroméxico Flight 498, on approach to Los Angeles International Airport from Mexico City, was struck by a small Piper aircraft that had strayed into a Terminal Control Area without clearance from Air Traffic Control. The Piper crashed into Cerritos Elementary School's unoccupied playground, but the Douglas DC-9 fell inverted (upside-down) and plowed into dense residential zones, immediately flattening four houses. The resulting fire destroyed eight more houses before firefighters could bring it under control. A total of 82 people died, including 15 people on the ground. A sculpture in the Cerritos Sculpture Garden memorializes the incident.

Geography

Cerritos lies along the Los Angeles County and Orange County border. The cities bordering Cerritos on the Los Angeles County side include Artesia in the center, Bellflower, Lakewood, Norwalk, Santa Fe Springs and La Mirada. Buena Park and La Palma border the city on the Orange County side. Other cities in the region include Cypress in Orange County, and Hawaiian Gardens and Long Beach in Los Angeles County.

The former postal ZIP code of Cerritos was 90701 and was shared with the city of Artesia; however, it was later changed to the exclusive 90703 to accommodate the increasing number of new addresses in the city during the mid-1990s.

Climate

Cerritos, as well as most of coastal Southern California, generally has a Mediterranean climate. Summers are warm to hot, and winters are mild, rarely falling below freezing. Precipitation occurs predominantly during the winter months.

Cerritos also has a unique "semi-marine" climate pattern within Los Angeles County. The fog that typically covers the beach cities rarely reaches Cerritos, but the breeze that comes along the San Gabriel River from the Pacific Ocean has a significant cooling effect. As a result, Cerritos is rarely affected by the smog, Santa Ana winds and smothering heat of the Los Angeles Basin.

Demographics 

The 2010 United States census reported that Cerritos had a population of 49,041. The racial makeup of Cerritos was 11,341 (23.1%) White (16.6% non-Hispanic White), 3,388 (6.9%) African-American, 131 (0.3%) Native American, 30,363 (61.9%) Asian,  138 (0.3%) Pacific Islander, 1,822 (3.7%) from other races and 1,858 (3.8%) from two or more races. There were 5,883 Hispanic or Latino residents, of any race (12.0%).

The census reported 48,937 people (99.8% of the population) lived in households, 86 (0.2%) lived in non-institutionalized group quarters and 18 (0%) were institutionalized.

There were 15,526 households, out of which 5,724 (36.9%) had children under the age of 18, 10,843 (69.8%) were married couples living together, 1,884 (12.1%) had a female householder with no husband present and 628 (4.0%) had a male householder with no wife present. There were 278 (1.8%) married couples, and 64 (0.4%) gay married couples or partnerships. 1,801 households (11.6%) were made up of individuals, and 1,005 (6.5%) had someone living alone who was 65 years of age or older. The average household size was 3.15. There were 13,355 families (86.0% of all households); the average family size was 3.40.

The population was spread out, with 10,013 people (20.4%) under the age of 18, 4,065 people (8.3%) aged 18 to 24, 11,134 people (22.7%) aged 25 to 44, 15,158 people (30.9%) aged 45 to 64 and 8,671 people (17.7%) 65 years of age or older. The median age was 44.0 years. For every 100 females, there were 92.6 males. For every 100 females age 18 and over, there were 89.6 males.

The homeowner vacancy rate was 0.7%; the rental vacancy rate was 3.1%. 39,392 people (80.3% of the population) lived in owner-occupied housing units and 9,545 people (19.5%) lived in rental housing units.

According to the United States Census Bureau, Cerritos had a median household income of $91,487, with 5.5% of the population living below the federal poverty line. Males had a median income of $50,103, versus $37,421 for females. The per-capita income for the city was $25,249. About 5.0% of the population and 4.0% of families were below the poverty line. Out of the total population, 5.4% of those under the age of 18 and 5.3% of those 65 and older were living below the poverty line.

Economy 
The two major sources of revenue for Cerritos are a retail sales tax and interest income from its general fund.

Employment within Cerritos is primarily in two districts, Los Cerritos Shopping Center and Cerritos Industrial Park. Businesses found in Cerritos Industrial Park provide jobs in light manufacturing and assembly of electronic and automotive parts, among other things. United Parcel Service, the city's largest employer with a staff of 6,000, is in the park. In 2010, Los Cerritos Center provided for 4,450 full and part-time positions, and the Cerritos Auto Square employs 2,160 people. Retail and industrial trades are responsible for Cerritos' $2 billion taxable retail sales and $7.2 billion assessed property valuation.

According to the California State Board of Equalization, Cerritos residents are the second-highest retail spenders in California (second to Beverly Hills), averaging $36,544 per resident. Applied Development Economics, in a presentation for the Cerritos Economic Commission on February 14, 2006, stated total annual household spending on retail is about $365 million a year with new car dealerships, grocery stores, department stores, service stations and eating places having the strongest demands.

A business survey conducted by Applied Development Economics in February 2006 revealed the total consumer breakdown in Cerritos is: 25% from residents from other parts of Southern California, about 21.9% from Cerritos residents, 18% from commuters, 16% from neighboring communities, 13% from business to business/employee transactions, 10% from residents of Orange County, 5% from households from outside of Southern California, mainly to purchase vehicles from the Auto Square.

Cerritos Auto Square 

The Cerritos Auto Square is an auto mall combining all auto dealers within Cerritos into one large three-block center accessible through two freeways.

Los Cerritos Center 

Since September 1971, the Los Cerritos Center has been an integral source of retail tax revenue.

Cerritos Towne Center 

The Cerritos Towne Center is a power center that combines offices, retail, hotel and entertainment facilities in one master planned project. The Towne Center includes the Cerritos Center for the Performing Arts, a 203-room Sheraton hotel and more than one million square feet (93,000 m2) of office space. The retail portion of the project includes several anchors and specialty shops. The project is bounded by 183rd Street to the south, Bloomfield Avenue to the west, Shoemaker Avenue to the east and the Artesia Freeway (Route 91) to the north.

The Magnolia Power Project 
The uncertainty of availability of electricity in California prompted the city of Cerritos on February 13, 2003, in conjunction with the cities of Anaheim, Burbank, Colton, Glendale and Pasadena, to participate in the Magnolia Power Project, which authorized the construction of a 310-megawatt power plant in Burbank. Cerritos receives 10 megawatts, or 4% of the total output, to power public facilities, park lighting, traffic signals and water wells. Excess power (approximately five megawatts) is sold to public and/or private agencies.

Top employers
According to the city's 2014 Comprehensive Annual Financial Report, the top employers in the city are:

Arts and culture 

The Cerritos Fine Arts and Historical Commission has an "Art in Public Places Program" whereby the city commissions artists to create sculptures and fountains to be displayed in public points of interest, commercial property and gateways into the city.

Tournament of Roses Parade 
Since 2002, the City of Cerritos has participated in the Tournament of Roses Parade held every New Year's Day in Pasadena. Floats in the parade are awarded prizes in the Tournament of Roses Parade.

Cerritos Center for the Performing Arts 

The Cerritos Center for the Performing Arts (CCPA) features live performances in music, magic, comedy, dance and drama. The 154,000-square-foot (14,300 m2) arts center has movable seats, floors, ceilings and stage areas, with a theater that can transform into six distinctive seating configurations, ranging in capacity from 921 to 1,800 seats. The facility also houses three additional meeting and banquet areas. The CCPA was designed by architect Barton Myers.

The cost of the CCPA had reached over $60 million by the end of construction and scheduling. It was designed to serve as a cultural icon for people in the community and formally opened its doors on January 9, 1993, with a four-day performance by Frank Sinatra.

The CCPA collected four awards for design shortly after its opening and has been named one of the top grossing theaters in its category in the United States.

Cerritos Millennium Library 

The Cerritos Library originally opened to the public on September 17, 1973, with a "First Ladies" theme (in recognition of former First Lady Pat Nixon's home in the community). Eight years later, the city made its first renovation to the library for $6.6 million.  were added for $5.4 million, and the remaining $1.2 million was spent on furniture and equipment.

In the late 1990s, Cerritos recognized the ever-changing innovation in information technology and the internet, and plans for a second renovation were approved. During the reconstruction, all materials were moved off site to temporary trailers in the parking lot of the Cerritos Towne Center for two years. The second renovation and expansion was completed on March 16, 2002.

At the time of its rededication, the newly renamed Cerritos Millennium Library was the first building in North America to be coated in titanium panels. This $40 million library features an elaborate interior design with themed reading rooms in a variety of old world and ultramodern styles. A third floor was added to include several conference rooms and an outdoor terrace.

The Cerritos Library holds a Smithsonian Affiliation. It was awarded the American Library Association/American Institute of Architects "Award of Excellence" in 1989. It was also honored with Reader's Digest's 2004 Best Library Award.

Cerritos Sculpture Garden

The Cerritos Sculpture Garden was dedicated on March 11, 2006, and included a ribbon cutting ceremony attended by representatives from Cerritos' sister city, Loreto, Baja California Sur, Mexico. It is in the Civic Center and is designed to house approximately 20 sculptures to be phased in over the coming years. At the time of the dedication ceremony, three sculptures were already in place:

 The Air Disaster Memorial, by sculptor Kathleen Caricof, honors by name all the victims of the Aeroméxico Flight 498 disaster on August 31, 1986.
 A replica of the Statue of Freedom that sits atop of the United States Capitol dome.
 Elements Fountain, by artist Jane DeDecker, depicts female embodiments of the four elements allegories (earth, water, wind and fire) over a reflecting pool.
The garden was made to be able to accommodate future sculpture installations in a lush landscape.

Parks and recreation

Cerritos Olympic Swim & Fitness Center 
The Cerritos Olympic Swim & Fitness Center provides year-round, indoor recreational, instructional and competitive swimming and gym.

The Swim Center was used by Olympians for swimming practices during the 1984 Summer Olympics in Los Angeles.

Pat Nixon Park 

The Pat Nixon Park is a recreational park that pays tribute to the late First Lady Pat Nixon on the site of her childhood home, which was destroyed by fire in 1978. The city of Cerritos undertook the project of building a senior center in 1993 to create a state-of-the-art public facility dedicated to its seniors with social events, services, life-enriching programs and clubs.

Community and neighborhood parks 

Heritage Park, a community park in the center of the city, pays tribute to revolutionary America and the founding of the country. It re-opened to the public in 2002 with a refurbished colonial-themed play island and moat.

Liberty Park, another community park in the western end of town, underwent massive renovation and re-opened to the public in February 2005. It features an updated community center, fitness center, rubberized jogging track and children's playground. Camp Liberty, a children's amphitheater within Liberty Park, has also been updated.

Cerritos Regional Park houses the Cerritos Sports Complex, the skate park and outdoor swimming pools. The unique characteristic is an artificial lake complete with sporting fish. Los Angeles County maintains 75% of Regional Park and Cerritos oversees the remaining 25%.

The city also has 18 neighborhood parks near residential tracts, an executive golf course and two community gymnasiums on the Cerritos and Whitney High School (Cerritos, California) campuses.

Government 
Cerritos operates under a council–manager form of government, established by the charter of the city of Cerritos in 1958. The five-member city council acts as the city's chief policy-making body and as members of the Cerritos Redevelopment Agency.

Local government

City Council 

The mayor, selected by the council, is its presiding officer and serves a one-year term. In the mayor's absence, the mayor pro tempore assumes his or her responsibilities. City Council elections were held on a Tuesday after the first Monday in April until the 2017 election. Effective with the 2020 California Primary election, the elections will be held on the Tuesday after the first Monday in March of even-numbered years. Council members are elected to a four-year term and at-large.

The city council, currently made up of Lynda Johnson, Naresh Solanki, and Frank Yokoyama, is directly responsible for the employment of only three individuals: the city manager, clerk/treasurer, and the city attorney.

Management of the city and coordination of city services are provided by:

Emergency services 
The Cerritos Sheriff's Station/Community Safety Center provides 24-hour safety services to Cerritos residents. Located in the Civic Center, the station houses the city's Community Safety Division and Los Angeles County Sheriff's Department personnel. The station was constructed by a referendum in 1996 and inaugurated in 1997. In 2006, the city council approved the construction of a  expansion to the sheriff's station, at a cost of $400,000.

Fire protection is provided by Los Angeles County Fire Department Station 30, the headquarters for Battalion 9, with ambulance transport by Care Ambulance Service.

Public services
The Los Angeles County Sheriff's Department operates the Cerritos Sheriff's Station and Community Safety Center, which was built into the Cerritos Civic Center. The  facility, built by the city, has a complaint/dispatch area, an 18-bed jail, administrative and detective personnel offices and a community meeting room. The sheriff's department operates the Lakewood Station in Lakewood, serving Cerritos.

The Los Angeles County Department of Health Services operates the Whittier Health Center in Whittier, serving Cerritos.

The United States Postal Service operates the Cerritos post office at 18122 Carmenita Road.

State and federal representation

Education

Primary and secondary schools

Public schools 

The majority of Cerritos is under the jurisdiction of the ABC Unified School District. A small portion on the west side of the city bounded by Palo Verde Avenue on the west, the San Gabriel River on the east, Artesia Boulevard on the north and South Street on the south is under the jurisdiction of the Bellflower Unified School District.

Children in Cerritos attend a neighborhood elementary school (kindergarten to 6th grade) before going to a middle school (7th and 8th grade) and then a high school (9th to 12th grade) unless admitted to Whitney High School, which covers 7th to 12th grade. Whitney High School is ranked as the best school in California, ahead of neighboring Oxford Academy, and 27th nationwide according to a 2012 U.S. News & World Report study.

Private schools 
Valley Christian High School is one of the largest private Protestant schools in Los Angeles County.

Colleges and universities 
Cerritos is also serviced by Cerritos College and Fremont College.

Education of citizens 
Eighty-five percent of high school graduates go on to higher education. Ten percent of the total population have an associates degree, 26% have a bachelor's degree and 11% have an advanced degree.

Transportation 
The city of Cerritos owns a fleet of federally funded buses known as the Cerritos On Wheels (or COW), which has stops throughout town. The acronym "COW" is a tribute to the city's origins as Dairy Valley, when cows outnumbered residents. The propane-fueled COW also connects to the Long Beach Transit, Orange County Transportation Authority, Norwalk Transit and Los Angeles MTA buses at overlapping stops on the borders of the city. Wi-Fi internet access is also accessible on the buses.

In conjunction with the COW, the city also provides a Dial-A-Ride service for its disabled and elderly commuters.

Cerritos is directly served by three major California freeways:
 SR 91 (the Artesia Freeway) cuts through the center of the city.
 Interstate 605 (the San Gabriel River Freeway) runs along the west side between the Los Cerritos Center and Auto Square.
 Interstate 5 (the Santa Ana Freeway) grazes Cerritos at the northeast border.

The major thoroughfares in Cerritos are Alondra Boulevard, Artesia Boulevard, Bloomfield Avenue, Carmenita Road, Del Amo Boulevard, Norwalk Boulevard, Pioneer Boulevard, Shoemaker Avenue, South Street, Studebaker Road and Valley View Avenue.

The nearby Port of Los Angeles and Port of Long Beach are major ports of entry from the Pacific Ocean for importing and exporting goods.

Airports that serve Cerritos include Los Angeles International Airport (LAX), John Wayne Airport in Orange County, Bob Hope Airport in Burbank, Ontario International Airport and the Long Beach Municipal Airport.

Notable people 
 Troy Aikman, American football quarterback for the Dallas Cowboys and member of the Pro Football Hall of Fame.
 Marcelo Balboa, MLS Colorado Rapids and US national soccer team member.
 Bret Barberie, former second baseman for the Florida Marlins, once married to TV news star Jillian Barberie.
 Johnny Chan, professional poker player.
  Morris Chestnut, actor.
 Robby Gordon, a NASCAR Sprint Cup driver, was born and raised in Cerritos. He lives in Orange, California.
 Rickey Cradle, MLB baseball player for the Seattle Mariners.
 Ben Howland, UCLA men's basketball head coach.
Jimmy Kim, taekwondo practitioner and instructor who won a gold medal in the heavyweight division at the 1988 Summer Olympics in Seoul, South Korea.
 Eddie Lewis, professional soccer player.
 Roger Lodge, host of the reality show Blind Date and radio sports announcer.
 Shane Mack, former MLB baseball player.
 Justin H. Min, actor.
 Todd McMillon, NFL player for the Chicago Bears.
 Nakoula Basseley Nakoula, filmmaker of Innocence of Muslims. 
 Pat Nixon, First Lady and wife of President Richard Nixon. Her family owned a truck farm formerly in Artesia, but now in Cerritos. Her childhood home was at what is now Pat Nixon Park.
 Max Park, an expert Rubik's Cube solver
 Lela Rochon, actress.
 Jorge Salcedo, NCAA soccer coach at UCLA. and L.A. Galaxy team member.
 Renato Sobral, MMA star and Strikeforce light heavyweight champion.
 José Luis Jair Soria, professional wrestler.
Jae Park, member of Korean band called Day6.
 Kirsten Vangsness, actress and writer.
John J. B. Wilson, copywriter, publicist and founder of the Golden Raspberry Awards (also known as the Razzies).
 Han Ye-seul, Korean actress.
 Jim Zorn, former NFL coach and quarterback.

In popular culture 
According to the Internet Movie Database (IMDB), the following productions have either been partially or entirely filmed in Cerritos:

 Almost There! (TV series, 1988)
 I'm Ready (music video, 2020)
 Wayne's World (1992)
 Imminent Contact (1992)
 Until Tomorrow Comes (1992)
 McAllister Affair (TV series, 1992)
 Coneheads (1993)
 She's All That (1999)
 The Flip Side (2001)
 Anokha (2004)
 A Modest Proposal (2006)
 Illegal (2007)
 Eli's Liquor Store (2007)
 The First Time (2007)
 Thunder (music video, 2008)
The main setting of Star Trek: Lower Decks, the California-class starship USS Cerritos, is named for the city.

Sister cities 
  Loreto, Baja California Sur, Mexico
  Banqiao District, Taiwan
  Itapetinga, Bahia, Brazil

See also 

 Cerritos Auto Square
 Cerritos Center for the Performing Arts
 Cerritos College
 Cerritos Library
 Cerritos Senior Center at Pat Nixon Park
 Cerritos Towne Center
 Cerritos Veterans Memorial
 Los Cerritos Center

References

Further reading 
 The Story of Cerritos: A History in Progress by Marilyn Cenovich
 History of Cerritos
 A Los Angeles Times article on Cerritos
 Images from Vestar's website: The Cerritos Towne Center development company
 The Cerritos 2005–2006 budget
 The City Manager's Letter to the City Council 2005
 CNN Article On Wireless Network
 Press Telegram Article On 2006 Capital Projects
 Cerritos Sculpture Garden press release
 Los Angeles Business Journal article on Cerritos
 Eftychiou, Audrey. Cerritos At 50: Celebrating Our Past and Our Future. Virginia Beach, VA: The Donning Company, 2006.
 2010 State of the City Presentation
 August 16, 2007 Edition of The Economist feature on Cerritos

External links

 
 Cerritos Chamber of Commerce

 
Cities in Los Angeles County, California
Gateway Cities
Incorporated cities and towns in California